The Spanish ship El Gamo was a 32-gun xebec-frigate of the Spanish Navy which was captured by Lord Cochrane in the action of 6 May 1801. The engagement is notable for the large disparity between the size and firepower of El Gamo and her opponent, the British brig ; the former was around four times the size, had much greater firepower and a crew six times the size of Speedy, which had a reduced crew of 54 at the time.

After her capture, El Gamo was sold to the ruler of Algiers as a merchantman.

References

External links
Brief biography of Lord Thomas Cochrane, including the skirmish with El Gamo
HMS Speedy vs El Gamo

1760s ships
Maritime incidents in 1801
Frigates of the Spanish Navy
Ships built in Spain
Xebecs